Vitula coconinoana is a species of snout moth. It was described by Herbert H. Neunzig in 1990. It has been recorded in North America from Alberta and Arizona.

References

Moths described in 1990
Phycitini